Rene Shevill (20 August 1910 – 10 May 1974) was an Australian cricketer. Shevill played two Tests for the Australia national women's cricket team. Rene Shevill was the fourteenth woman to play test cricket for Australia.

References

1910 births
1974 deaths
Australia women Test cricketers